"Holdin On" was released as a single from Flume's debut studio album, Flume. It was released on 9 November 2012 and reached its peak of number 17 in Australia in March 2013 and was certified 2× Platinum.

The track was nominated for ARIA Award for Song of the Year at the ARIA Music Awards of 2013 but lost to "Resolution" by Matt Corby. The Joe Nappa directed music video was nominated for Best Video.

The track won the Best Independent Dance/Electronica Single and was nominated for Best Independent Single/EP at the Australian Independent Record Label awards of 2013. It also came in at number four in the Triple J Hottest 100, 2012.

Music video
The music video was directed by Joe Nappa and released on 6 March 2013.

Track listing
 Digital download
 "Holdin On" – 2:36

Charts

Year-end charts

Certifications

References

2012 songs
2013 singles
Flume (musician) songs
Future Classic singles
Song recordings produced by Flume (musician)
Songs written by Flume (musician)